This is a list of short place names, natively in Latin characters or romanized, with one or two letters.

One-letter place names 

A, a former village in Kami-Amakusa city, Kumamoto, Japan
Á, a farm in Dalabyggð municipality, Dalasýsla, Iceland. Á is Icelandic for "river".
Ά, an eco-hippie community in Buenos Aires Province, Argentina
D, a river in Oregon, United States. It was also formerly believed to be the world's shortest river.
E, a mountain in Hokkaidō, Japan
E, a river in the Highlands of Scotland
É, an ancient name for Dadu River in Sichuan, China
H, also known as H Island, an island in Dyke Marsh Wildlife Preserve, in Fairfax County, Virginia
I, a town in Fujian Province, China
Ì, Scottish Gaelic name for island of Iona, Scotland (also called Ì Chaluim Chille)
L, two lakes in Nebraska both named for their right-angled shape
Ô, a castle near Mortrée, France
O, a river in Devon, England
Ó Street, a street in Terézváros, Budapest, Hungary
O, a river in Toyama, Japan
Ö, a village in Sweden. Ö is Swedish for "island".
Ø, a hill in Jutland, Denmark. Ø is Danish for "island".
U, a place in Panama
U, a municipality on Pohnpei in the Federated States of Micronesia
Ú, a place in Madagascar
U, a place in Vietnam
Ü, a geographic division and a historical region in Tibet, China
W, a national park in Niger and Benin.
Y, a commune in the department of Somme, France
Y, a river in the north of Russia.
Y, a former census-designated place in Alaska, United States (recently renamed Susitna North)
Å, a village in Andøy municipality, Nordland, Norway. Å is Danish, Norwegian and Swedish for "brook" or "small river".
Å, a village in Moskenes municipality, Nordland, Norway
Å, a village in Meldal municipality, Sør-Trøndelag, Norway
Å, a village in Åfjord municipality, Sør-Trøndelag, Norway
Å, a village in Ibestad municipality, Troms, Norway
Å, a village in Lavangen municipality, Troms, Norway
Å, a village in Tranøy municipality, Troms, Norway
Å, a village in Gloppen municipality, Vestland, Norway
Å, a place in Funen, Denmark
Å, a village in Norrköping municipality, Östergötland, Sweden
Å, a village in Örnsköldsvik municipality, Västernorrland, Sweden
Å, a village in Kramfors municipality, Västernorrland, Sweden
Å, a village in Söderhamn municipality, Gävleborg, Sweden 
Å, a village in Uddevalla municipality, Västra Götaland, Sweden
Ö, a village in Ånge Municipality, Västernorrland County, Sweden
G, a village in Kayanza Province, Burundi

Two-letter place names 

Aa, a village in Estonia
Aa, a village in South Sulawesi, Indonesia
Aa, several rivers in Belgium, France, Germany, the Netherlands and Switzerland
Aa, a skerry at the entrance to Skelda Voe, Shetland Islands, Scotland
Ab, in Madhya Pradesh, India
Ae, a village in Dumfries and Galloway, Scotland
Ág, a village in Baranya county, Hungary
Ai, a Biblical city in Canaan
Ai, a community in Alabama, United States
Ai, a community in Georgia, United States
Ai, a community in North Carolina, United States
Ai, a community in Ohio, United States
Ai, several rivers in China, Japan, and Taiwan
Áj, Hungarian name for Háj, Slovakia
Ål, a municipality in Buskerud county, Norway
Ål, a village in Leksand municipality, Sweden
An, a county in Sichuan, China
Ao, a village in Estonia
Ao, a train station in Hyōgo, Japan
As, a municipality in Limburg province, Belgium
Aš, a town in the Karlovy Vary Region, Czech Republic
Ås, a municipality in Akershus county, Norway
Ås, the Swedish name for the Harju quarter of Helsinki, Finland
Ås, a hundred of Västergötland in Sweden
Ås, a village in Västmanland, Sweden
Ås, a village in Jämtland, Sweden
Au, a town in the state of Vorarlberg, Austria
Au, a district of the city of Munich, Germany
Au, name of three municipalities in Germany: Au am Rhein, Au (Breisgau) and Au in der Hallertau
Au, name of almost hundred of villages and hamlets in Germany, mostly in Bavaria: Au (Sieg) and others
Au, a town in the Kankan Region, Guinea
Au, a municipality in the canton of St. Gallen, Switzerland
Au, a village in the canton of Zürich, Switzerland
Ay, an island in Banda Sea, Indonesia
 Aÿ, a former commune in the department of Marne, France
Ba, a village in Serbia
Ba, a town in the Ba province of Fiji
Ba, a sub-district in Tha Tum district, Surin Province, Thailand
Bỉ, Vietnamese name for Belgium
Bo, a city in Sierra Leone
Bo, a town in Kim Bôi, Hòa Bình Province, Vietnam
Bo, the Asturian name for the parish of Boo, Asturias, Spain
Bo, a sub-district in Khlung District, Chanthaburi Province, Thailand
Bo, a village in Burkina Faso
Bu, a hamlet on Wyre in the Orkney Islands, Scotland
Bû, a commune in the department of Eure-et-Loir, France
By, a village in Åfjord municipality, Norway
By, a commune in the department of Doubs, France
Bø, Telemark and Bø, Nordland, municipalities in Telemark and Nordland, Norway; also the name of several farms
Bő, a village in Vas county, Hungary
Cả, a river in Vietnam
Ce, a historical kingdom in modern-day Scotland
Ci, a county in Hebei, China
Đà, a river in Vietnam
Di, a town in Burkina Faso
Do, several villages in Bosnia and Herzegovina, including Do (Hadžići) and Do (Trebinje)
Du, a sub-district in Kanthararom District, Sisaket, Thailand
Du, a sub-district in Prang Ku District, Sisaket, Thailand
Du, a sub-district in Rasi Salai District, Sisaket, Thailand
Du, a mountain in Henan province, China
Dú, the Irish name for Hurcle, a townland in County Meath, Ireland
Đu, a town in Thai Nguyen, Vietnam
Ea, a town in the Basque Country, Spain
Ed, an unincorporated community in Kentucky, US
Ed, a locality in Västra Götaland County, Sweden
Ee, a village in the Noardeast-Fryslân municipality, Friesland, Netherlands
Eg, a town in Afghanistan
Eg, a former farm in Kristiansand, Norway
Ei, a town in Ibusuki District, Kagoshima, Japan
Ei, a train station in Kagoshima, Japan
Eo, river between Galicia and Asturias, Spain
Ep, a community in Kentucky, United States
Ér, Hungarian name for Ier river, Romania
Eš, a village and municipality in the Vysočina Region, Czech Republic
Eu, a commune in the department of Seine-Maritime, France
Fa, a commune in the department of Aude, France
 Fi, a town in Segou city in Mali 
Fu, a county in Shaanxi, China
Fu, a village in Mora Municipality, Sweden
Gu, a county in Shanxi, China
Gy, a commune in the department of Haute-Saône, France
Gy, a municipality in the canton of Geneva, Switzerland
Ha, a town in Paro, Paro District, Bhutan
Hå, a municipality in Rogaland, Norway
He, a farm in Nord-Odal municipality, Norway
He, a county in Anhui, China
Ho, a town in Ghana
Ho, a village in Jutland, Denmark
 Hồ, a town in Thuận Thành, Bắc Ninh, Vietnam
Hø, a farm in Inderøy municipality, Norway
Hu, a county in Shaanxi, China
Ib, a railway town in India
Ie, an island and village in Okinawa, Japan
Ie, old Irish name for the Scottish island of Iona or Ì (or Ì Chaluim Chille)
If, an island and fortress in southern France
Ig, a settlement and municipality in Slovenia
Ii, a municipality in Northern Ostrobothnia, Finland
Ii, a train station in Yamaguchi, Japan
IJ, a double lake in the Netherlands (the digraph IJ is sometimes considered a single letter in Dutch, so this could also be seen as a one-letter name)
Ik, a river in Russia
Iž, an island in Croatia
Io, innermost moon of Jupiter
Io, an island in Hordaland, Norway
Io, alternative name of an island in the Aegean, Greece
Ip, a village in Sălaj County, Romania
Is, a village in Nizhniy Tura gorsovet of Sverdlovskaya Oblast Oblast, Russia
Iž, an island in Croatia
Ji, a county in Shanxi, China
Ji, a county in Tianjin, China
Ju, a county in Shandong, China
Ka, a farm in Østre Toten municipality, Norway
Ko, a village and subdistrict in Li District, Lamphun, Thailand
Kő, the Hungarian name for Kamenac, a village in Kneževi Vinogradi municipality, Osijek-Baranja County, Croatia
Kō, a train station in Aichi, Japan
Ku, a sub-district in Prang Ku District, Sisaket, Thailand
La, a farm in Sykkylven municipality, Norway
Lå, a farm in Ål municipality, Norway
La, a river in Vietnam
Lâ, a town in Burkina Faso
Le, a farm in Vik, Norway
Le, a sub-district in Kapong District, Phang Nga, Thailand
Lé, the Irish name for Lea, a parish in Ireland
Li, a county in Gansu, China
Li, a county in Hebei, China
Li, a county in Hunan, China
Li, a county in Sichuan, China
Li, a mountain located in the northeast of Xi'an in Shaanxi Province, China where the tomb of the First Emperor is located.
Li, a village in Sokndal municipality, Norway
Li, a district in Lamphun Province, Thailand
Lo, a town in West Flanders, Belgium
Lo, name of several farms in Norway
Lo, a sub-district in Chun District, Phayao, Thailand
Lo, a village in Di Department, Burkina Faso
Lô, a river in the North of Vietnam
Lø, farm in Vindafjord municipality, Norway
Lu, a municipality in Piedmont, Italy
Lu, a county in Sichuan, China
Lü, a village in the canton of Graubünden, Switzerland
Lú, the Irish name for Louth, a village and county in Ireland
Lủ, a village in Hanoi, Vietnam
Ma, a river in Vietnam
Me, a town in Gia Viễn, Ninh Bình, Vietnam
Mo, a village in Modalen municipality, Hordaland, Norway
Mo, a sub-district in Kapong District, Phang Nga, Thailand
Mu, a river in Burma
Mù (Mö in the local dialect), a village in the Edolo municipality of Lombardy, Italy
My, a village in Liège province, Belgium
Nå, a village in Ullensvang municipality, Norway
Ne, a municipality in Liguria, Italy
Ni, a river of New Caledonia
Ni, a river in Virginia, United States
No, a village in Denmark
No, a lake in South Sudan
Ny, a municipality in Luxembourg province, Belgium
Oa, a river in Meldal municipality, Norway
Oa, a peninsula on the island of Islay in the Inner Hebrides, Scotland
Ob, a town in Russia
Ob, a major river in Russia, and the seventh-longest river in the world
Ob, a gulf in Russia
Öd, several small villages in different municipalities in Bavaria, Germany
Oe, a village on Yeongheung island, Incheon city, Korea
Ōe, a town in Yamagata, Japan
Ōe, a former town in Kyoto, Japan
Ōe, a train station in Kyoto, Japan
Ōe, a train station in Aichi, Japan
Oe, a train station in Nagasaki, Japan
Oe, a town in Liège city in Walloon Region, Belgium
Of, a town in the province of Trabzon, Turkey
Og, a river in Wiltshire, England
Oi, a sub-district in Pong District, Phayao, Thailand
Ōi, a town in Ōi District, Fukui, Japan
Ōi, a town in Kanagawa, Japan
Ōi, a former town in Saitama, Japan
Ok, a shield volcano located in highlands above Borgarfjörður, in the west of Iceland
O K, a community in Kentucky, United States
Om, a river in Russia
Øm, a town on the island of Zealand, Denmark
Øn, a village in Sogn og Fjordane county, Norway
Oô, a commune in the department of Haute-Garonne, France
Or, original name of Isthmus of Perekop in Ukraine
Ör, a district in Sundbyberg municipality, Sweden
Őr, a village in Szabolcs-Szatmár-Bereg county, Hungary
Os, a municipality in Hedmark, Norway
Os, a municipality in Hordaland, Norway
Oś, a village in Kluczbork County, Poland
Ōu, a mountain range in Japan
Ox, a mountain range in Ireland
Oy, a municipality in Bavaria, Germany
Oz, a commune in the department of Isère, France
Oz, a community in Kentucky, United States
Pa, a village in Nouna Department in Burkina Faso
Pâ, a town in Burkina Faso
Pi, a town in Catalonia, Spain
Pi, a county in Sichuan, China
Po, a river in Italy
Po, a river in Virginia, United States
Po, a sub-district in Wiang Kaen District, Chiang Rai, Thailand
Po, a sub-district in Bueng Bun District, Sisaket, Thailand
Pó, a civil parish in Bombarral, Portugal
Pô, a city in Burkina Faso
Pu, a county in Shanxi, China
Py, a commune in Pyrénées-Orientales, France
Qi, a county in Kaifeng, Henan, China
Qi, a county in Hebi, Henan, China
Qi, a county in Jinzhong, Shanxi, China
Qu, a county in Sichuan, China
Ra, a farm in Borre municipality, Norway
Rå, a farm in Ringerike municipality, Norway
Re, a village in the region of Piedmont, Italy
Re, a municipality in Vestfold county, Norway
Ré, an island in Charente-Maritime department, France
Ri, a commune in the department of Orne, France
Ro, an island near Kastelorizo, Greece
Ro, a municipality in the region of Emilia-Romagna, Italy
Ro, name of several farms in Norway
Ru, a village in the municipality of Vilasantar, Galicia, Spain
Ry, a town in central Jutland, Denmark
Ry, a commune in the department of Seine-Maritime, France
Sa, a sub-district in Chiang Muan District, Phayao, Thailand
Sâ, a town in Burkina Faso
Sé, several places, including Brazil, Hungary and Portugal
Si, a county in Anhui, China
Si, a sub-district in Khun Han District, Sisaket, Thailand
Sí, the Irish name for Shee, a townland in County Monaghan, Ireland
So, a sub-district in So Phisai District, Bueng Kan, Thailand
Só, Hungarian name for Tuzla, Bosnia and Herzegovina
Su, a village in the municipality of Riner, Catalonia , Spain
Sy, a commune in the department of Ardennes, France
Sy, a municipality in Liège province, Belgium
Ta, a sub-district in Khun Tan District, Chiang Rai, Thailand
Ta, a river in Virginia, United States
Ta, a village in Kurdistan Province, Iran
TB, a community in Maryland, United States
Ti, a settlement in Oklahoma, United States
Tô, village in Toma Department, Burkina Faso
Tu, a mountain in Cao County, Shandong Province
Tu, a city in Japan. Tu is in Kunrei-shiki romanization and Tsu in Hepburn romanization is more common. (Other than Mount E this is the shortest place name in Japan in both Japanese phonology and orthography. All other Japanese place names in this section require at least two kana.)
Ub, a town in Serbia
Ui, a town in Republic of Korea
Ug, short name for Tiszaug, Hungary
Ul, a parish in the Oliveira de Azeméis municipality in Portugal
Ul, a beach in Punta Križa, Croatia
Ur, ancient city in Mesopotamia
Ur, a town in Catalonia, Spain
Ur, a commune in the department of Pyrénées-Orientales, France
Us, a commune in the department of Val-d'Oise, France
Uz, a commune in the department of Hautes-Pyrénées, France
Uz, river and valley in Romania
Ūz, a village in Iran
Uz, Kentucky (the shortest name in Kentucky)
Ve, a village in Norway
Ve, a group of skerries off Papa Stour in the Shetland Islands, Scotland
Vi, a village near Sundsvall in Sweden
Vò, a municipality in the region of Veneto, Italy
 Vò, a village in Lạc Thủy, Hòa Bình, Vietnam
Vy, a town in Burkina Faso
Wa, a municipality in Ghana
Wu, a region in the Jiangsu and Zhejiang provinces of China
, a hamlet in Luxembourg province, Belgium
Xi, a county in Shanxi, China
Xi, a county in Henan, China
Xy, a commune in Hướng Hóa, Quảng Trị, Vietnam
Yb, two villages and a municipality in Komi in Russia
Ye, a town in Mon State, Burma
Ye, a county in Henan, China
Ye, a village on the island of Lanzarote, Spain
Yé, department and town in Burkina Faso
Yi, a name of three counties in Hebei, Liaoning and Anhui, China
Yí, a river in Uruguay
Y P, a desert in the western United States
Ys, a mythological city in Brittany
Yu, a county in Hebei, China
Yu, a county in Shanxi, China
Yu, a river on the north of Russia
Yū, a former town, now district in Iwakuni, Yamaguchi, Japan
Zu, a village in Badakhshan Province, Afghanistan

See also
List of long place names
Long place names in English
W National Park, a national park intersecting in Benin, Niger, and Burkina Faso

References

Short
Names